Arsenal Football Club is a professional football club based in Islington, London, England. Arsenal plays in the Premier League, the top flight of English football. The club has won 13 league titles (including one unbeaten title), a record 14 FA Cups, two League Cups, 16 FA Community Shields, the League Centenary Trophy, one European Cup Winners' Cup, and one Inter-Cities Fairs Cup.



Results
Arsenal's score comes first

Football League First Division

Final League table

FA Cup

References

1904-05
English football clubs 1904–05 season